Bowers Gifford and North Benfleet is a civil parish in the Basildon district, in the county of Essex, England. The parish includes the villages of Bowers Gifford and North Benfleet. In 2011 the parish had a population of 1936. The parish was formed on 1 April 2010. There are 7 listed buildings in Bowers Gifford and North Benfleet. The local council is Bowers Gifford and North Benfleet Parish Council.

History
Bowers Gifford had been an ancient parish, that included an exclave on Canvey Island. The parish became part of Billericay Rural District in 1894 and the Bowers Gifford Parish Council was formed. The rural district, parish and parish council were abolished in 1934 when the area became part of Billericay Urban District. North Benfleet has a similar history. It was an ancient parish with four distinct exclaves on Canvey Island. The five exclaves of Bowers Gifford and North Benfleet on the island were eliminated in 1880 when the civil parish of Canvey Island was created. North Benfleet Parish Council existed between 1894 and 1934 and was replaced, along with Bowers Gifford Parish Council and Billericay Rural District Council, with Billericay Urban District Council. Billericay Urban District was renamed Basildon in 1955. When the Basildon District was created in 1974 to replace Basildon Urban District the new district was entirely unparished. The civil parish of Bowers Gifford and North Benfleet was created on 1 April 2010 following a community governance review. The local council of Bowers Gifford and North Benfleet Parish Council was created for the new parish.

Geography
The northern boundary is the A127 road. In the east it follows the A1245 road, the A130 road and East Haven Creek. The southern boundary, also formed by East Haven Creek, is with the civil parish of Canvey Island. The western boundary is Vange Creek, Pitseahall Fleet and an irregular boundary mostly aligned to fields.

References

External links 
 Parish Council

Civil parishes in Essex
Borough of Basildon